Gary Schneider (born November 25, 1954) is a South African-born American photographer known for his portraiture and self-portraits. According to the John Simon Guggenheim Memorial Foundation, which awarded him a Guggenheim Fellowship in 2013, his "early work in painting, performance, and film remain integral to his explorations of portraiture. He strives to marry art and science, identity and obscurity, figuration and abstraction, the carnal and the spiritual."

Life and education 
Gary Schneider was born in East London, South Africa and was raised in Cape Town. His BFA is from Michaelis School of Fine Art, University of Cape Town and his MFA is from Pratt Institute, Brooklyn.

By the time Schneider enrolled at the University of Cape Town in 1975, "the world of art and ideas—in particular, forms of conceptual art that used the body as a medium to explore phenomenology and behavior—had begun to provide an essential reprieve, allowing him to construct and control a space of his own."

In the late '70s, Schneider left South Africa for New York City to work for Richard Foreman's Ontological-Hysteric Theater. There he met his partner John Erdman, a performer in conceptual film, video, and theatre production. The pair formed Schneider/Erdman Inc. in 1981 "through which Schneider quickly rose to prominence as a master printer of other artists' photographs."

Career 
In 1977, Schneider had his first solo exhibition at Artists Space where he did an installation and performance. Following the exhibition, he continued to make films; most notably Salters Cottages completed in 1981. A  book of Salters Cottages film stills was published by Dashwood Books in 2019.

In 1998, he completed "Genetic Self-Portrait," which is a set of fifty-five photographs that make up fourteen images of his own body. The work was exhibited in the Musée de l'Élysée in Lausanne, Switzerland as well as the International Center of Photography in New York City and the Massachusetts Museum of Contemporary Art. The book was published by Light Work, Syracuse in 1999.

"Portraits", a survey of his work, was mounted at Harvard Art Museums in 2004. It traveled to the Contemporary Museum in Honolulu. A fully illustrated catalog was published by Yale Press.

Aperture published his “"Nudes" in 2005 and exhibited the life-size photographs in New York. The exhibition traveled to the Reykjavik Art Museum in 2010. A survey exhibition, "Flesh", was mounted by the Museum of Photographic Arts in San Diego in 2008.

"HandBook" is Schneider's 2010 artist book published by Aperture and printed by Schneider on a print-on-demand press. "Handbook, South African Artists", Schneider's Guggenheim Fellowship project, was published by Fourthwall Books in Johannesburg, South Africa in 2015.

Solo museum exhibitions 
2018: "Analog Culture", Harvard Art Museums, Cambridge, MA.
2010: "Nudes", Reykjavik Art Museum, Hafnarhus, Reykjavik, Iceland.
2009: "Life@Life Size", Contemporary Art Galleries, University of Connecticut, Storrs, CT.
2008: "Flesh: The Portraiture of Gary Schneider", Museum of Photographic Art, San Diego, CA.
2007: "Genetic Self-Portrait", The Warehouse Gallery, Syracuse, NY.
2007: "John 1989–2004", The Greenhouse Gallery, Guernsey, Channel Islands, UK.
2005: "Nudes", Aperture Gallery, New York, NY.
2004: "Portraits", Harvard Art Museums, Cambridge, MA.
2004: "Portraits", Contemporary Museum, Honolulu, HI.
2004: "Biology", Suzanne H Arnold Art Gallery, Lebanon Valley College, Annvile, PA.
2003: "Genetic Self-Portrait", University Art Museum, SUNY, Albany, NY.
2003: "Genetic Self-Portrait", University Galleries, University of Florida, Gainesville, FL.
2000: "Genetic Self-Portrait", International Center of Photography, New York, NY.
1998: "Genetic Self-Portrait", Musee de l'Eysee de Lausanne, Lausanne, Switzerland.
1997: "Recent Photographs", The Haggerty Museum, Marquette University, Milwaukee, WI.
1977: "Naming", installation and performance, Artist Space, New York, NY.

Awards and grants 
2016: Chancellor Scholar Award, Rutgers University, New Brunswick, NJ.
2015: Board of Trustees Research and Fellowship for Scholarly Excellence, Rutgers University, New Brunswick, NJ.
2014: Affiliated Fellow of the American Academy in Rome, Italy. Rutgers University, Mason Gross School of the Arts.
2013: John Simon Guggenheim Memorial Foundation Fellowship, New York, NY.
2010: Photobook Award Kassel 2009/2010, Handbook, Kassel, Germany.
2010: Yaddo Artist Residency, Saratoga Springs, NY.
2007: Photo Annual Award: Magazine. New York Times Magazine: "Microbesity-What Makes So Many Fat", New York, NY.
2007: Lead Award: Reportage, New York Times Magazine: "Microbesity-What Makes So Many Fat", Hamburg, Germany.
2007: Guernsey Residency, Guernsey, Channel Islands, UK.
2005: Lou Stoumen Prize, Museum of Photographic Arts, San Diego, CA.
2004: National Endowment for the Arts Grant, "Gary Schneider: Portraits", Harvard University Art Museums, Boston, MA. 
2004: AICA Award: Best Exhibition Mid Career Artist, International Association of Art Critics, Boston, MA.
2000: Alfred Eisenstaedt Award: Science and Technology, Photo Essay, Columbia University Journalism School and Life Magazine, New York, NY.

Books and catalogs 
2019: Salters Cottages. Dashwood Books, New York, NY.
2018: Analog Culture: Printer’s Proofs from the Schneider/Erdman Photography Lab, editor Jennifer Quick, Harvard Art Museums, Cambridge, MA.
2015: HandBook, South African Artists. Fourthwall Books, Johannesburg, South Africa.
2012: Portrait Sequences 1975.  OneStar Press, Paris, France.
2010: HandBook, Aperture. New York, NY.
2007: John 1989–2004. Snell, Eric. The Greenhouse Gallery, Guernsey, Channel Islands, UK.
2005: Nudes. Aperture, New York, NY.
2004: Gary Schneider: Portraits. Martin Kao, Deborah. Yale University Press, New Haven, CT., in association with Harvard Art Museums, Cambridge, MA.
2001: Yezerski Family Portrait. Howard Yezerski Gallery, Boston, MA.
1999: Genetic Self-Portrait. Essays by Ann Thomas, Lori Pauli, and Bettyann Kevles. Light Work, Syracuse, NY.
1997: John in Sixteen Parts. Martin Kao, Deborah. Howard Yezerski Gallery, Boston, MA; Stephen Daiter Photography, Chicago, IL; PPOW Gallery, New York, NY.
1997: Recent Photographs. Carter, Dr. Curtis. The Haggerty Museum, Marquette University, Milwaukee, MI. Brochure.

Museum collections 
Schneider's work is represented in many museums including: 
 Art Institute of Chicago,
 Brooklyn Museum 
 George Eastman Museum
 Harvard Art Museums
 Iziko South African National Gallery
 Metropolitan Museum of Art 
 Musée de l'Élysée in Lausanne
 Museum of Fine Arts Boston,
 Museum of Fine Art Houston
 National Gallery of Canada
 National Museum of African Art
 Reykjavik Art Museum
 Whitney Museum of American Art
 Yale University Art Gallery.

External links
 
Howard Yezerski Gallery
Stephen Daiter Gallery

References

Living people
1954 births
South African emigrants to the United States
Artists from Cape Town
Pratt Institute alumni
University of Cape Town alumni
South African photographers
Photographers from New York City
20th-century American photographers
21st-century American photographers
American portrait photographers
Alumni of Herzlia High School